The Warragul Football and Netball Club, nicknamed the Gulls, is an Australian rules football and netball club based in the city of the same name in the state of Victoria.

The club teams currently compete in the Gippsland League, fielding Senior, Reserve, Under 18 and Under 16 football teams, as well as A, B, C Grade and Under 17, Under 15 and Under 13 netball teams.

History
The Club was formed in 1879 by William Paul and its first games were played against other local football clubs including Drouin, Buln Buln, Morwell, Traralgon and Berwick.

Warragul had a great run of success at the commencement of official football competitions in Gippsland, winning six Challenge Cups (premierships) between 1889 and 1897!

In 1894, Warragul footballer, Andrew Watson, died of internal injuries after a match in Bunyip on Saturday, 2 June 1894.

The Warragul Half Holiday Football Club was formed in 1894, wearing the colours - all blue guernsey, with blue and white stockings.

In 1922 Warragul, Central Gippsland FA Premiers defeated Rosedale, North Gippsland FA Premiers in a challenge match in October to win the unofficial title of "Gippsland Premiers"! 

Warragul's guernsey was originally black with a red Yoke, until 2000 when the guernsey was changed to the current colours of teal, white, red and black.  The 'Gulls' have had a proud history especially through the successful years of the early 1920s, 1970s and 1980s.

Lean seasons in 1998 and 1999 in the Gippsland/Latrobe FL, saw the club transfer to the West Gippsland FL, with the thought of providing a better chance of retaining players. The Victorian Country Football League provided this clearance for the Gulls to the WGFL, where they played from 2000–2004. However, the merging of the GLFL and WGFL saw Warragul resume its battles with former foes from 2005.

Since 2005, the club has been a part of the Gippsland FL, competing against clubs such as Bairnsdale, Drouin, Garfield (until their transfer to the EDFL), Moe, Morwell, Traralgon, Maffra, Sale, Wonthaggi and Leongatha.

In 2010 and 2011, Warragul finished bottom of the ladder, winning only one game in each respective season. The club is currently building a young base of players to build on into the future, many of whom had success with the club in both the Under 16 and 18's previously.

Football Leagues Timeline
1889: South Gippsland Challenge Cup
1890: Robinson's Challenge Cup
1891: Kennedy's Challenge Cup
1892: Gippsland & Feilchenfeld Cup 
1893: Thomas Challenge Cup
1894: Ross Challenge Cup
1895: Storie Challenge Cup 
 1896: ?
1897: Harlem Hotel Cup 
1898-1908: West Gippsland FA
1909-1915: Central Gippsland FL
1916-1918: No Football Played. World War I 
1919-1921: Central & West Gippsland FA
1922-1940: Central Gippsland FL
1941-1945: Club in recess. World War II
1946-1953: Central Gippsland FL
1954-1994: La Trobe Valley FL
1995-1999: Gippsland-La Trobe FL
2000-2004: West Gippsland Latrobe FL (Western Division)
2005-2009: West Gippsland Latrobe Football League (Premier Division)
2010–2019: Gippsland Football League
2020: Club in recess: Covid 19
2021-present: Gippsland Football League

Gulls Football Premierships 
SENIORS:
South Gippsland Challenge Cup
1889 (undefeated) 
Kennedy's Challenge Cup
1890 (undefeated) 
Robinson's Challenge Cup
1891 
Thomas Challenge Cup
1893 
Ross Challenge Cup
1894 
Harlem Challenge Cup
1897 
West Gippsland Football Association
1900
1907 
Central Gippsland Football Association
1922  
1927 
1932  
1938 
LaTrobe Valley Football League
 1974, 1976, 1984
West Gippsland Latrobe FL (Western Division)
2003

RESERVES:
Central Gippsland Football League
1946, 1947, 1951, 1953
La Trobe Valley Football League
1974, 1984, 1996

THIRDS:
1979, 1981, 1982, 1985, 2004

FOURTHS:
2003, 2004, 2006

JUNIORS:
Drouin Junior Football Association
1910 
Central Gippsland Football Association
1922

Gulls Leading Goalkickers

Gulls Football League Best and Fairest Winners

Club Life Members 
Life Members who have contributed greatly to support the success of the Warragul Football/Netball Club

Maurice Reeves, Robert Ballingall, Alan Walkinshaw, Bruce Nicholl, Robert Vaughan, Anthony Nott, Hugh Bingham, Claire Henshall, William Best, Tom Malady, Kevin Mills, John Heenan, Neville McDonough, Colin McKenzie, Dorothy Carland, Michael Waters, Audrey Ray, Michael Vick, Alan Glen, Bryan Fitzpatrick, Ray Waters, Ray Cropley, Ray Costelloe, Gary Olsson, Graeme Gahan, Rod Pollock, Betty Nott, Julie Pollock, Jim Johnson, Neil Stapleton, Kevin Collis, John Shiels, Noel Gleeson, Ann Nott, Tony Flack, Arlene Bible.

VFL/AFL Players 
The following list notes current and former VFL/AFL players that have played with the Warragul Football Club prior to making their VFL / AFL debut.

 1978 - Gary Ayres (Hawthorn)
 1933 - George Batson (St. Kilda)
 1911 - Norm Brooker (Richmond)
 1898 - Johnny Coghlan (Melbourne) 
 1971 - Graeme G. Cook (Footscray)
 1966 - Graham Croft (St. Kilda)
 1953 - Jim Cusack (Fitzroy)
 1969 - Bruce Davidson (Footscray)
 1908 - Alex Dunstan (Collingwood)
 1907 - Horrie Farmer (St Kilda)
 1939 - Alan Fields (Fitzroy)
 1992 - Ashley Green (Essendon, Brisbane)
 1961 - Robert Hickman (Richmond)
 1942 - George Hoskins (Fitzroy)
 1994 - Trent Hotton (Collingwood & Carlton)
 1974 - Gerry Lynn - (Hawthorn)
 2000 - Robert Murphy (Western Bulldogs)
 1963 - John Murton (Collingwood)
 1953 - Wally Nash (Hawthorn) 
 1966 - Alan Noonan (Essendon)
 1939 - Noel Price (Fitzroy)
 2011 - Michael Ross (Essendon)
 1968 - Barry Round (Footscray, Sydney)
 2020 - Caleb Serong (Fremantle)
 2022 - Jai Serong (Hawthorn)
 1919 - Bert Taylor (Fitzroy)
 1947 - Pat Twomey (Collingwood)
 1921 - Les Wallace (Melbourne)
 1921 - Harry Watson (Fitzroy)
 1997 - Matthew Watson (Essendon)
 1926 - Harry Weidner (Richmond)
 1952 - Geoff Williams (Geelong)

Senior Football Results

Reserves & Under 18

Under 16's

Grand Final Appearances

2012 Under 18 Grand Final
Grand Final | at Morwell
WARRAGUL 8.6.54 def by
BAIRNSDALE 8.12.60
2009 Under 18 Grand Final
Grand Final | at Morwell
WARRAGUL 8.11.59  def by
MAFFRA 12.6.78
2008 Under 18 Grand Final
Grand Final | at Traralgon
WARRAGUL 4.4 28 def by
TRARALGON 7.7 49
2006 Under 16 Grand Final
Grand Final | at Traralgon
WARRAGUL 9.13 67 def
TRARALGON 5.12 42

Netball: 2007 to 2012

References

External links 

 Facebook page
 Instagram site
 Gippsland FNL Best & Fairest Winners
 1927 - Warragul FC & Yallourn FC team photos
 1947 - Warrugal FC Reserves: Premiership team photo
 1952 - Central Gippsland FL Premiers: Warragul FC team photo

Australian rules football clubs in Victoria (Australia)
Netball teams in Victoria (Australia)
Sports clubs established in 1879
1879 establishments in Australia
Gippsland Football League
Australian rules football clubs established in 1879